Hege Bae Nyholt (born 2 August 1978) is a Norwegian politician.

She was elected representative to the Storting from the constituency of Sør-Trøndelag for the period 2021–2025, for the Red Party.

References

1978 births
Living people
Red Party (Norway) politicians
Sør-Trøndelag politicians
Members of the Storting
Women members of the Storting